Kibwé Johnson (born July 17, 1981) is an American Olympic track and field athlete who specializes in the hammer throw. He has represented his country at the World Championships in Athletics three times (2007, 2011, and 2015). Competed in the 2012 London Olympics where he made the final and finished 9th. No American had made the final since 1996. Johnson competed in 2016 Rio de Janeiro Olympics.

He is a three-time medalist at the Pan American Games, having taken silver in 2007 and improved to the gold in 2011 (where he broke the Games record), and then repeated in 2015 in Toronto. He set his personal best of 80.31 meters (263 ft 5.8 in) in 2011. He was the 2011 USA Outdoor Champion in the hammer throw and the 2008 USA Indoor Champion in the weight throw where he recorded the second best mark in US history.

Career
Born in San Francisco, he initially started as a discus thrower, before starting to focus more on the hammer while studying at the University of Georgia. Johnson later moved to Moorpark Junior College in Moorpark, California before finishing at Ashland University where he later graduated and represented them in NCAA Division II competitions. He competed at the 2004 United States Olympic Trials in both the discus and hammer, placing eighth and 19th respectively. He placed third in the weight throw at the 2005 USA Indoor Track and Field Championships and threw a best of 24.54 meters (80 ft 6.25 in) at the Oiler Open meet – a distance which ranked him as the third best American and eleventh best ever in the history of the event. A personal record hammer throw of 78.25 m in May saw him rank third nationally that year. He was the runner-up in the weight throw at the 2006 USA Indoors, then finished in fourth place in the hammer throw at the USA Outdoor Track and Field Championships later that year.

Johnson had his breakthrough season in 2007. He won the discus event at the Mt. SAC Relays then came runner-up in the hammer at the 2007 USA Outdoors. Making his international debut at the 2007 Pan American Games, he had a throw of 73.23 m on his final attempt, which brought him the silver medal behind Canada's James Steacy. Johnson was selected to represent the United States at the 2007 World Championships in Athletics, but failed to record a valid throw in the qualifying round. In spite of this he remained positive about the experience and fellow throwers Tore Gustafsson and Koji Murofushi offered him encouragement and technical advice. In 2008 he won the USA Indoors weight throw title – his first win at national level – but he fouled out at the 2008 Olympic Trials later in the season. This frustrating result was the catalyst for his move to train with Dr. Bondarchuk.

After missing much of 2009, he returned to form in 2010 as he finished as runner-up in the hammer at the 2010 USA Outdoor Track and Field Championships (throwing 76.31 m). A personal best throw of 80.31 m at the 2011 USA Outdoors saw Johnson take his first ever national outdoor title. As national champion, he gained his second opportunity to compete on the global stage at the 2011 World Championships in Athletics, but his best throw of 75.06 m in qualifying was not enough to reach the final. He was also chosen to represent his country at the 2011 Pan American Games in Guadalajara. At the competition he improved from his silver in 2007 to take the gold medal with a Pan American Games record mark of 79.63 m, improving Lance Deal's record from 1999.

In the last ten years, Kibwé has won 5 US Championships with 3 runner-up finishes. He competed at the 2012 Summer Olympics, finishing 8th in the men's hammer final. One of the most versatile throwers of all time, he has the unofficial world record for combination of Hammer throw (80.31m/263'5"), Discus (65.11m/213'7"), Indoor weight throw (25.12m/82'5")

Personal life
He is coached by former Soviet Olympic champion and coach, Dr. Anatoliy Bondarchuk. He is married to Crystal Smith Johnson, a former Canadian champion and record holder who also trained with Bondarchuk. They have two daughters, born on 18 April 2012, and September 6, 2015. Johnson resides in Bradenton, Florida, where he is a throws coach at IMG Academy.

References

External links
 
 

1981 births
Living people
American male hammer throwers
Athletes (track and field) at the 2011 Pan American Games
Athletes (track and field) at the 2015 Pan American Games
African-American male track and field athletes
Pan American Games gold medalists for the United States
Ashland Eagles men's track and field athletes
Georgia Bulldogs track and field athletes
North Gwinnett High School alumni
Junior college men's track and field athletes in the United States
Athletes (track and field) at the 2012 Summer Olympics
Athletes (track and field) at the 2016 Summer Olympics
Olympic track and field athletes of the United States
Male weight throwers
Athletes (track and field) at the 2007 Pan American Games
Pan American Games medalists in athletics (track and field)
Pan American Games silver medalists for the United States
World Athletics Championships athletes for the United States
Track and field athletes from San Francisco
USA Outdoor Track and Field Championships winners
Medalists at the 2015 Pan American Games
Medalists at the 2011 Pan American Games
21st-century African-American sportspeople
20th-century African-American people